Gangasandra Siddappa Basavaraj (born 1941) is an Indian politician. He is a member of Lok Sabha (2019–present), elected from Tumkur constituency in 2019. He started his political career with Congress, and is now a member of the Bharatiya Janata Party (BJP). He defeated former prime minister  Sri H. D. Deve Gowda in the 2019 Indian general elections by a margin of nearly 15,000 votes in Tumkur Lok Sabha Constituency. He has been elected to Lok Sabha from Tumkur five times, in 1984, 1989 and 1999 as member of Indian National Congress, and in 2009 and 2019 as member of BJP. In 2004 elections, he finished third as Congress candidate behind BJP and JD-S candidates in Tumkur. He joined BJP after this defeat. In 2014 he was the losing candidate for BJP. However, he defeated the political think-tank HD Deve Gowda in the same constituency in the 2019 Indian general election

Political career
 Member of 8th Lok Sabha
 Member of 9th Lok Sabha  (1989-1991)
 Member of 13th Lok Sabha (1999-2004) 
 Member of 15th Lok Sabha (2009-2014)
 Member of 17th Lok Sabha

References

Bharatiya Janata Party politicians from Karnataka
India MPs 1999–2004
Living people
India MPs 2009–2014
1941 births
India MPs 1984–1989
India MPs 1989–1991
Lok Sabha members from Karnataka
People from Tumkur district
National Democratic Alliance candidates in the 2014 Indian general election
India MPs 2019–present